BK Kenty is a Swedish sports club located in Linköping.

Background
Bollklubben Kenty was formed on 10 April 1932  by John Schön, Gösta Dahlqvist, Enar Johansson and Folke Dättermark – all teenagers. The Kenty name has its origins in kid's interest at that time in reading Cowboy and Indian books. A few letters in the name Kentucky were changed and hence the name Kenty was born.

Initially the club operated as a youth club before men's and boys' football became the club's main activity. In 1968 BK Kenty women's football was added. Other sports that the club ran included ice hockey, bandy, tennis, bowling and handball before these sections were transferred to other clubs.

BK Kenty has participated mainly in the middle and lower divisions of the Swedish football league system.  The club currently plays in Division 2 Östra Götaland which is the fourth tier of Swedish football. They play their home matches at the Fredriksbergs IP in Linköping.

BK Kenty are affiliated to the Östergötlands Fotbollförbund.

Season to season

Footnotes

External links
 BK Kenty – Official website

Sport in Linköping
Football clubs in Östergötland County
Defunct bandy clubs in Sweden
Association football clubs established in 1932
Bandy clubs established in 1932
1932 establishments in Sweden